Marina Records is a German record label started in 1993 and specialising in indie pop. Acts include Ashby, Pearlfishers, Cowboy Mouth (the Grahame Skinner band, not the better-known American act) and The Bathers.

Marina has also released albums by such acts as Paul Quinn & The Independent Group, Shack (the "lost" Waterpistol album) and Josef K

Discography/Catalogue
 Gazelle - Better Days  1993  
 The Bathers - Lagoon Blues  1993  
 Gazelle - Better Days  1994  
 Eight Miles High - Triple Pulse  1994  
 Gazelle - Time Will Tell  1994  
 Gazelle - Everything Inside  1994  
 Paul Quinn & The Independent Group - Will I Ever Be Inside Of You?  1994  
 Cowboy Mouth - Life As A Dog  1995  
 Sugartown - Swimming In The Horsespool  1995  
 Cowboy Mouth - My Life As A Dog EP  1995  
 Various Artists - From Marina With Love  1995  
 The Bathers - Sunpowder 1995  
 Marina T-Shirt - Music Is Love T-Shirt 1995  
 Malcolm Ross - Low Shot  1995  
 Camping - Maritime Strick- und Regenmoden 1995  
 Shack - Waterpistol 1995  
 Cowboy Mouth - Love Is Dead 1995  
 Cowboy Mouth - Sugartown EP 1996  
 The Secret Goldfish - Aqua-Pet...You Make Me  1996  
 Mindstore - Lightening The Load  1996  
 Various Artists - In Bed With Marina  1996  
 The Bathers - Kelvingrove Baby  1997  
 Mindstore - Double Sided Walk EP  1997  
 Adventures In Stereo - Adventures In Stereo  1997  
 The Pearlfishers - The Strange Underworld Of The Tall Poppies  1997  
 The Secret Goldfish - Jet Streams 1997  
 The Pearlfishers - Even On A Sunday Afternoon EP 1997  
 Mindstore - PC Streets EP 1997  
 Jazzateers - Here Comes That Feeling 1997  
 Jazzateers - I Shot The President 1997  
 Sugartown - Slow Flows The River 1997  
 Various Artists - Songs For Marshmallow Lovers 1997  
 Malcolm Ross - Happy Boy  1998  
 Die Moulinettes - 20 Blumen  1998  
 The Pearlfishers - Banana Sandwich EP 1998  
 Die Moulinettes - Herr Rossi Sucht Das Glueck EP 1998  
 The Pale Fountains - Longshot For Your Love  1998  
 Adventures In Stereo - Alternative Stereo Sounds 1998  
 Peter Thomas - Moonflowers and Mini-Skirts  1998  
 Josef K - Endless Soul  1998  
 Peter Thomas - Opium 12" EP  1998  
 The Pearlfishers - The Young Picnickers  1999  
 Paula - Glueck Und Aerger EP 1999  
 June & The Exit Wounds - A Little More Haven Hamilton, Please  2000  
 Paula - Als Es Passiert EP 2000  
 The Aluminum Group - Introducing...   2000  
 Paula - Himmelfahrt  2000  
 Paula - Jimmy EP  2000  
 Various Artists - Caroline Now! 2000  
 Paula - Jimmy/Als Es Passierte EP  2000  
 The Free Design - Cosmic Peekaboo   2001  
 The Pearlfishers - Across The Milky Way  2001  
 Ashby - Power Ballads  2001  
 Roddy Frame - Surf   2002  
 Peter Thomas - Moonflowers & Mini-Skirts   2003  
 James Kirk - You Can Make It If You Boogie  2003  
 The Pearlfishers - Sky Meadows  2003  
 Benjamin v. Stuckrad-Barre - Autodiscographie  2003  
 Various Artists - Ave Marina - Ten Years of Marina Records  2004  
 Der Plan -  Die Verschwörung   2004  
 The Magic Circles -  Meet Me In Milan EP  2004  
 The Pearlfishers -  A Sunflower at Christmas   2004  
 Ashby - Looks Like You've Already Won  2005  
 The Pearlfishers -  The Young Picnickers + Bonus Tracks   2005  
 Various Artists - The In-Kraut  2005  
 Various Artists - The In-Kraut - Vol. 2  2006
 Various Artists - Goosebumps - 25 Years Of Marina Records 2018

See also
 List of record labels

External links
 Marina Records - Planet Marina
 https://read.amazon.com/kp/embed?asin=B0812FJS45&preview=newtab&linkCode=kpe&ref_=cm_sw_r_kb_dp_.lMkEbEA3ER5D

German record labels
Record labels established in 1993
Indie pop record labels